Anggo Yulian (born 7 July 1987) is an Indonesian footballer who currently plays for 
PSGC Ciamis as a midfielder in the Liga 2.

External links 
 

1987 births
Association football midfielders
Living people
Balinese people
Indonesian footballers
Liga 1 (Indonesia) players
Persiba Balikpapan players
Persijap Jepara players
Indonesian Premier League players
Arema F.C. players
Pelita Bandung Raya players
People from Denpasar
Sportspeople from Bali